Sonoma International Film Festival (SIFF) is a 501 (c)(3) non-profit arts organization dedicated to promoting the best in independent film and filmmakers from around the world, inspiring savvy film lovers and introducing the power of film to student filmmakers.

Mission Statement 

The Sonoma International Film Festival provides a welcoming, entertaining, and inspiring cinematic experience that supports and promotes independent films and celebrates the cultural diversity in the Sonoma Valley through the art of film. The Sonoma International Film Festival is a non-profit 501 (c)(3). Tax ID 68-0428999.

About SIFF 

Named “One of the 25 Coolest Festivals” by MovieMaker Magazine and one of “America’s Top Ten Destination Film Festivals” by USA Today, the five-day film festival takes place every March screening an estimated 120 films from 200 filmmakers representing 40 countries. An estimated 7,500 live attendees and 30,000 virtual viewers, makes SIFF one of the largest arts non-profit organizations in Sonoma Valley.

SIFF is noted for its participation of film and media industry jurists and panelists and continues to grow its reputation in finding and cultivating new talent from around the world, creating a significant platform for networking and distribution opportunities. SIFF programs full-length features, documentaries, as well as shorts programming in Animation, Comedy, Culinary, Documentary, Dramatic and Foreign categories. Cash and production completion grants are awarded annually to Jury and Audience Award winners.

Sonoma International Film Festival is committed to the 50/50 gender parity industry pledge, as well as programming films that cover the gamut of human experience from environmental, LGBTQI+, social justice and other diverse viewpoints.

History

Founded in 1997 by friends Carolyn Stolman and Jerry Seltzer, the Sonoma International Film Festival was created to promote Sonoma, California, and its Sister Cities, as a destination festival to showcase the cinematic arts. 

Early festivals focused on the breadth of Bay Area filmmakers with work from industry veterans such as Francis Ford Coppola, John Lasseter and Danny Glover showcased. Continued focus on not only new film programming, but on what Sonoma Valley is known for—exceptional food and wine—were early components to the expanded festival experience.

Since 2002, SIFF’s key initiative, the Sonoma Valley High School Media Arts Program, has provided leadership and financial resources to create a state-of-the-art studio in order for students to explore creative pursuits and diverse storytelling viewpoints through the power of film. To date, Sonoma International Film Festival has given more than $650,000, with hundreds of students graduating through the program.

Prominent festival attendees include: Brooke Adams, Karen Allen, David Arquette, Demián Bichir, Willie Brown, Francis Ford Coppola, Dominique Crenn, James Cromwell, Blythe Danner, David Duchonvy, Jon Favreau, Fionnula Flanagan, Tyler Florence, Robert Forster, Danny Glover, Melissa Joan Hart, Patricia Heaton, Agnieszka Holland, Ernie Hudson, Lauren Hutton, Robert Kamen, Michael Keaton, John Lasseter, Jude Law, Melissa Leo, Ray Liotta, Christopher Lloyd, William Macy, Jena Malone, Richard May, Angelina Mondavi, Matthew Modine, Gavin Newsom, Julia Ormond, Joe Pantoliano, Mary-Louise Parker, Alexander Payne, Eric Roberts, Mark Romanek, Emmy Rossum, Meg Ryan, Susan Sarandon, Tony Shaloub, Rachael Taylor, Casey Thompson, Deborah Unger, John Waters, Kimberly Williams-Paisley, Robin Williams, Bruce Willis and Saul Zaentz.

Noted festival jurists and panelists include: Karen Allen, John Bailey, Ed Begley Jr., Steve Chagolian, James Cromwell, Nigel Daly, Tom Davia, Elisabeth Costa de Beauregard, Joe Della Rosa, David Dinerstein, Scott Feinberg, Gudrun Giddings, Pamela Guest, Grant Gullickson, JD Heyman, Michael Howell, Robert Kamen, Gabrielle Kelly, Hunt Lowry, Michèle Maheux, Leonard Maltin, Mike Repesch, Arianne Rocchi, Ingrid Rudefors, Anna Serner, Bart Walker, Lucy Walker and April Wright.

Honors And Tributes

Francis Ford Coppola 1998

Danny Glover 1999

John Lasseter 2000

Richard May 2001

Robert Forster 2002

Alexander Payne 2003

Mark Romanek 2003

Agnieszka Holland 2003

Blythe Danner 2004

Saul Zaentz 2005

Danny Glover 2006

John Lasseter 2007

Michael Keaton 2008

Bruce Willis 2009

Lauren Hutton 2010

Susan Sarandon 2011

Christopher Lloyd 2012

Mary-Louise Parker 2013

Demián Bichir 2013

Jude Law 2014

Alan Rickman 2015

Robert Kamen 2016

Meg Ryan 2016

Leadership

Staff

Ginny Krieger, Executive Director, began her career with SIFF as a Board of Directors member in 2001. She has held management roles within the organization including Co-Director, Administrative Director, and Assistant Director prior to serving in her current role. Krieger’s career includes C-level positions with health, wellness, fitness and luxury services companies prior to relocating to Sonoma from Boston. Her management, finance, strategy and organizational acumen provide the needed guidance and leadership necessary to produce world-class festival experiences year after year.

Carl Spence, Artistic Director, brings decades of film festival and industry experience including longtime leadership roles with Seattle International Film Festival, Palm Springs International Film Festival, Miami Film Festival, and San Francisco International Film Festival, among others. Concurrent to his role with Sonoma International Film Festival, he is the Co-Founder, Co-Director, and Chief Curator of the Orcas Island Film Festival. Spence also serves as a consultant to key industry stalwarts such as FilmFreeway and Eventive; and as served as a jurist at internationally acclaimed festivals including Sundance Film Festival, Berlin Film Festival, SXSW Film Festival, Savannah Film Festival, Ashland Film Festival, Cleveland Film Festival, Frameline and Vancouver International Film Festival.

Kevin W. McNeely, Director Emeritus, continues to inspire and support creative development and pursuits in Sonoma and around the world. Under his guidance, the Sonoma Valley High School Media Arts Program was conceived in 2002 and remains SIFF's primary annual charitable giving initiative. He served as the SIFF Board of Directors Chairman prior to becoming Executive Director in 2010 and Artistic Director in 2020.

Board of Directors

Bob Berg (Chairman), Ken Wornick (Vice Chairman), Keith Casale (Treasurer), Cynthia Wornick (Secretary), Armar A. Archbold, Amanda Bevan, Chris Cahill, Jon Curry, Greg Hanss, Kimberly Hughes, Patrick Pesetti, and Johanna Wolf.

References

External links

 

Film festivals in the San Francisco Bay Area
Sonoma, California
Tourist attractions in Sonoma County, California